In rail transport modelling, Sn3½ is a scale/gauge combination derived from S scale to represent narrow gauge  track by using  gauge track (the same as HO gauge). The scale is 1:64.

Sn3½ is popular in South Africa, Australia (particularly Western Australia, Queensland and Tasmania where narrow gauge systems exist) and New Zealand.

Sn3½ is very rarely or never used for modelling in other countries with 3 foot 6 (1067mm) gauge railways such as Japan, Taiwan, Indonesia etc.

Track 
As  track scales down to 16.5mm at 1:64, modelers use HO gauge track (which represents Standard gauge at 1:87 scale) on Sn3½ layouts.

New Zealand 

Sn3½ is the primary scale for modeling New Zealand's narrow gauge 3 ft 6 in railways. The majority of rolling stock available, are white-metal kits, making them considerably more expensive and heavier than other scales and countries. Many of these kits are highly detailed. Buildings are generally hand-made and track (HO gauge track) can either be purchased or hand laid with sleepers and rail. Alternatives for modeling New Zealand railways is 1:120 or TT scale, known as NZ120, as it is a cheaper option. HOn3½ gauge, HO scale with 12mm gauge, is also increasing in popularity.

New Zealand Sn3½ suppliers and manufacturers 

 South Dock Models
 Railmaster Exports
 New Zealand Finescale
 North Yard (Model Railway Parts)

Sm 
Sm gauge is also defined by the German NEM 10 standard, representing Continental European metre gauge.

See also
 List of narrow-gauge model railway scales
 Rail transport modelling
 Rail transport modelling scales
 List of rail transport modelling scale standards

References

Citations

Bibliography

 
 

Model railroad scales
Narrow gauge railway modelling